"Nemohamo Rumor" is the 58th single by Japanese idol girl group AKB48. It was released on September 29, 2021. Member Nana Okada served as both lead singer and choreographic center.

Background and release
The was released a year and a half (560 days) after, "Shitsuren, Arigatō" and was marketed as the first single in which only AKB48 members participated since 2010's "Chance no Junban".
The single was released in seven physical editions, comprising both regular and limited editions of Type A, Type B, and Type C, and a theater version.
The single's release was first announced at the group's 15th anniversary on May 23, 2021 at Pia Arena MM. The groupmembers who would participate in the A-side track were announced on July 7, 2021.

This marked the last single for member Yui Yokoyama, the first single in which Hitomi Honda participated after returned from Iz*One, and the first single released after Minami Minegishi's graduation. Nana Okada returned to the center position for the first time since Jabaja in 2018.

"Nemohamo Rumor" was first performed on the TBS program "THE MUSIC DAY 2021" on July 17, 2021. During Yuki Kashiwagi's hiatus for health reasons, her choreography was performed by Erina Oda. The choreography is in a locking style and was choreographed by Jun Kandabashi, the dance teacher of the Mie High School dance club "Serious Flavor", who also appears in the music video.

B-sides
"Hanarete Ite mo" (離れていても; Even When We're Apart) was first released in 2020 as a charity single performed by all the group's current members and some of the notable graduates, but was later credited to the senbatsu members from the single Shitsuren, Arigatō and graduates only. Every active member in the group participated in either the A-side or one of the B-sides.

Track list
All the lyrics were written by Yasushi Akimoto.

Type A
Type A was released in regular and limited edition version, with different covers but the same track list.

Type B
Type B was released in regular and limited edition version, with different covers but the same track list.

Type C
Type C was released in regular and limited edition version, with different covers but the same track list.

Theater edition

Participating members

"Nemohamo Rumor" 
"根も葉もRumor" ("Nemohamo Rumor") performed by selected senbatsu members, consisting of:
Team A: Erī Chiba, Mion Mukaichi, Rei Nishikawa, Yui Yokoyama
Team K: Tomu Muto
Team B: Yuki Kashiwagi, Megu Taniguchi, Satone Kubo
Team 4: Nana Okada, Mizuki Yamauchi, Yuiri Murayama
Team 8: Hitomi Honda, Momoka Onishi, Miu Shitao, Narumi Kuranō, Rin Okabe, Yui Oguri, Yui Yokoyama

"Hanarete Ite mo" 
"Hanarete Ite mo" (離れていても; Even When We're Apart) performed by selected senbatsu and graduate members, consisting of:
Team A: Mion Mukaichi, Yui Yokoyama
Team K: Tomu Muto
Team B: Yuki Kashiwagi, Satone Kubo, Seina Fukuoka
Team 4: Nana Okada, Mizuki Yamauchi, Yuiri Murayama
Team 8: Rin Okabe, Yui Oguri
Graduates: Atsuko Maeda, Haruna Kojima, Jurina Matsui,  Mariko Shinoda, Minami Minegishi, Minami Takahashi, Rino Sashihara, Sayaka Yamamoto, Tomomi Itano, Yuko Oshima

"Ōsawagi Tengoku" 
"Ōsawagi Tengoku" (大騒ぎ天国; Uproar Paradise), performed by selected Second Generation members, consisting of:
Team A: Erī Chiba, Kurumi Suzuki, Manaka Taguchi, Minami Satō, Nazuna Furukawa, Rei Nishikawa, Saki Michieda, Suzuha Yamane
Team K: Ayami Nagatomo, Kana Yasuda, Megumi Nagano, Orin Muto, Ran Kobayashi, Rina Okada
Team B: Ayu Yamabe, Haruna Saito, Hitomi Otake, Maho Omori, Satone Kubo
Team 4: Haruka Kurosu, Kyoka Tada, Kaori Inagaki, Ma Chia-ling, Mai Homma, Mizuki Yamauchi, Miyū Kuramoto, Nanami Asai, Sena Ishiwata, Yuzuka Yoshihashi

"Seikōtōtei" 
"Seikōtōtei" (大騒ぎ天国; High Pressure in the West and Low in the East), performed by Team 8, consisting of: Mitsuho Fukutomo, Yurina Gyoten, Hiyuka Sakagawa, Sayūna Hama, Yuki Harumoto, Haruna Hashimoto, Yūna Hattori,  Ayaka Hidaritomo, Hikaru Hirano, Hitomi Honda, Misaki Kawahara, Narumi Kuranō, Mashiro Mitomo, Serika Nagano, Erina Oda, Yūi Oguri, Rin Okabe, Hinako Okuhara, Hinano Okumoto, Nagisa Sakaguchi, Maria Shimizu, Miu Shitao, Yūka Suzuki, Ayane Takahashi, Sayaka Takahashi, Kaoru Takaoka, Remi Tokunaga, Sorano Uemi, Hatsuka Utada, Kyoka Yamada, Yui Yokoyama, Karen Yoshida, Nanase Yoshikawa, Momoka Ōnishi

"Kimi ga Inaku Naru Juunigatsu" 
"君がいなくなる12月" ("Kimi ga Inaku Naru Juunigatsu"; "December When You Leave") performed by Yui Yokoyama

"Black Jaguar" 
"ブラックジャガー" ("Black Jaguar") performed by selected First Generation performers, consisting of:
Team A: Anna Iriyama, Ayana Shinozaki, Miho Miyazaki, Rena Kato
Team K: Ami Yumoto, Haruka Komiyama, Hinana Shimoguchi, Manami Ichikawa, Shinobu Mogi
Team B: Chiyori Nakanishi, Kayoko Takita, Saho Iwatate, Saki Kitazawa, Seina Fukuoka, Shizuka Ōya, Yukari Sasaki
Team 4: Kiara Satō, Miyū Omori

Charts

Weekly charts

Year-end charts

Release history

References 

2021 singles
2020 songs
2021 songs
AKB48 songs
Japanese-language songs
Songs with lyrics by Yasushi Akimoto
Oricon Weekly number-one singles
Billboard Japan Hot 100 number-one singles